Baiju Bawra (Lit. "Baiju the Insane", born as Baijnath Mishra) was a dhrupad musician from medieval India. Nearly all the information on Baiju Bawra comes from legends, and lacks historical authenticity. According to the most popular legends, he lived in the Mughal period during the 16th and 17th centuries. He was one of the court musicians of Man Singh Tomar of Gwalher (now Gwalior).

Chanderi–Gwalior legend 

According to a story, mentioned by Susheela Misra in Some immortals of Hindustani music, Baiju Bawra was born as Baijnath Mishra in a poor Brahmin family in Champaner, Gujarat Sultanate. After his father's death, his mother, a devotee of Krishna, went to Vrindavan. There, Baiju met his teacher Swami Haridas, and was trained in a gurukula. He also adopted an orphan named Gopal, and trained him to be a musician.

Gradually, Baiju became famous, and was invited to the court of the Raja of Chanderi. In Chanderi, Baiju's adopted son Gopal also became famous. Gopal married his disciple Prabha, and the couple had a daughter named Meera. Around this time, Raja Man Singh Tomar invited him to Gwalior, where he reached the height of his fame. The queen of Gwalior, Rani Mriganayani, also became his disciple.

Once, while Baiju was away, Gopal left Chanderi permanently, lured by some Kashmiri merchants who wanted him to serve their king. When Baiju returned home, he was shocked to find his entire family gone. He became a mendicant, and wandered from place to place, looking for his beloved adopted grandchild Meera. People thought of him as an insane person, and thus, he came to be known as "bawra". (Alternative legends say that he came to be known as "Bawra", because he was obsessed with classical music.)

Tansen, another famous disciple of Swami Haridas, had heard Baiju's praise from his teacher. He asked his own patron Raja Ramachandra Baghela of Rewa to organize a musical contest, in hope that Baiju would come to this contest to salvage his reputation. Baiju came to the contest, and performed extraordinary feats such as hypnotizing deer through his rendering of Raag Mrigranjini and melting a stone slab through Raag Malkauns. Tansen recognized him and embraced him.

The legends in the books preserved in Jai Vilas Mahal in Gwalior state that Baiju Bawra could light oil lamps by singing Raag Deepak; make it rain by singing the raags Megh, Megh Malhar, or Gaud Malhar; and bloom flowers by singing raga Bahar.

Baiju bawra write a book ekadasha and ramsagar.

Baiju Bawra died in Chanderi after suffering from typhoid on Vasant Panchami day in 1610. A purported samadhi of Baiju Bawra is located in Chanderi.

Legend of Bacchu 

Some medieval narratives, mentioned in works such as Mirat-i-Sikandari (17th century), describe an incident about a Gujarati singer called Bacchu (also known as Bakshu or Manjhu). According to the narrative, Bacchu was a musician in the court of Sultan Bahadur Shah of Gujarat. When the Mughal emperor Humayun attacked Bahadur Shah's contingent in Mandu, Bacchu fell in the hands of a Mughal soldier. He was about to be killed, when he was recognized by a Raja allied with the Mughals. The Raja introduced him to emperor Humayun, who was pleased with his singing and granted his wish to release the Gujarati prisoners. Bacchu remained in service of the emperor for some days, but then ran away to Sultan Bahadur Shah, who had escaped from Mandu to Champaner.

Bacchu is identified with Baiju by a section of scholars. Howevers, others believe that Bacchu and Baiju were two distinct persons.

In popular culture

Baiju Bawra, a 1952 Hindi-language movie depicts a completely fictionalized version of Baiju's life. The film was a big commercial success. In the movie, Tansen is known to be the greatest musician alive. Nobody is allowed to sing in the city unless he or she can sing better than Tansen. Anyone who attempts to sing, without doing it better than Tansen, is executed. Baiju's father dies when Tansen's sentry tries to stop him from singing. Years later, Baiju avenges his father's death by defeating Tansen in a musical duel.

References

Date of birth unknown
Date of death unknown
Hindustani singers
Mughal Empire people
15th-century Indian musicians
16th-century Indian musicians
15th-century Indian singers
16th-century Indian singers
16th-century Indian composers
17th-century Indian composers
17th-century Indian musicians